English singer Jess Glynne has released two studio albums, 18 singles (including six as a featured artist) and 17 music videos.

Glynne made her debut on Clean Bandit's single "Rather Be" in January 2014, which peaked at number one on the UK Singles Chart. The following month, she was featured on Route 94's single "My Love", which also topped the charts in the UK. Her debut solo single "Right Here" was released in July 2014 as the lead single from her debut album I Cry When I Laugh. The song peaked at number six in the UK. She again collaborated with Clean Bandit later that year on "Real Love". Further singles "Hold My Hand", "Don't Be So Hard on Yourself" and the Tinie Tempah track "Not Letting Go" also topped the UK charts, giving Glynne five number-one singles in the space of one year and making her the second British female solo artist to achieve the tally after Cheryl. The album charted atop the UK Albums Chart and has since been certified four times platinum by the British Phonographic Industry for sales exceeding 1,200,000 copies.

In January 2018, Glynne featured on the Rudimental-headed single "These Days" with Macklemore and Dan Caplen. With the single reaching number one in the UK, Glynne surpassed Cheryl to become the British female solo artist with the most chart-toppers in UK chart history. Glynne extended this lead further with the release of her second studio album's lead single "I'll Be There", which became her seventh number-one single, while additional singles "All I Am" and "Thursday" reached the top ten in the UK. Glynne released her second studio album Always in Between on 12 October 2018.

Studio albums

Singles

As lead artist

As featured artist

Promotional singles

Other charted songs

Guest appearances

Music videos

Songwriting credits

Notes

References

External links
 
 
 
 

Discographies of British artists
Pop music discographies